Moju Chowdhury Hat is a market village and tourist center in Charramani Mohan Union of Lakshmipur Sadar Upazila in southeastern Bangladesh. According to Banglapedia, the sluice gate on Lakshmipur Khal (canal) is a tourist attraction and an transport hub in southeastern Bangladesh, with over 10,000 travelling passengers per day.

Geography 
The village is situated on the north bank of Lakshmipur Khal near where it meets the Meghna River.

Transport 
National highway  N809 is interrupted at Moju Chowdhury Hat by the Meghna River.

There is a ferry ghat (terminal) at Moju Chowdhury Hat. In 2011, The Daily Star reported that unsafe vessels sail the dangerous waters of the Meghna from the village.

See also 
 List of villages in Bangladesh
 Rahmat Khali Canal
 Towns of Bangladesh
 Unions of Bangladesh

References

External links 

 Official website of Charramani Mohan Union

 

Towns in Bangladesh